Suleiman Samura (born 26 June 1997) is a Sierra Leonean footballer who last played as a midfielder for San Diego 1904.

Career

Craig Bellamy Foundation Academy
Samura was an early entrant in the Craig Bellamy Foundation Academy in Tombo. As part of the foundation, Samura spent time with clubs across the UK, including Liverpool, Manchester City and Cardiff City.

Loan to Phnom Penh Crown
In March 2015, Samura moved to Cambodian side Phnom Penh Crown for an eight-month spell.

United States
Samura spent time with Fresno FC U-23 in the USL PDL in 2018, and with National Premier Soccer League side Laredo Heat in 2019, before transferring to professional side Fresno FC on 25 July 2019.

References

External links

1997 births
Living people
Association football midfielders
Sierra Leonean footballers
Sierra Leonean expatriate footballers
Expatriate soccer players in the United States
Laredo Heat players
Fresno FC players
San Diego Loyal SC players
USL League Two players
National Premier Soccer League players
USL Championship players